Kristin Bahner (born August 15, 1972) is an American politician serving in the Minnesota House of Representatives since 2019. A member of the Minnesota Democratic–Farmer–Labor Party (DFL), Bahner represents District 37B in the northwestern Twin Cities metropolitan area, including the city of Maple Grove in Hennepin County, Minnesota.

Early life, education, and career
Bahner was raised in Richfield, Minnesota. She attended Gustavus Adolphus College, graduating with a bachelor of arts in communications.

Bahner is an IT consultant and small business owner specializing in agile software development and project management.

Bahner was one of the original organizers of the Minnesota Women's March that brought an estimated 110,000 people to the Minnesota State Capitol in January 2017 making it one of the largest single-day events in Minnesota history.

Minnesota House of Representatives
Bahner was elected to the Minnesota House of Representatives in 2018 and has been reelected every two years since. Bahner first ran unsuccessfully in 2016, challenging one-term Republican incumbent Dennis Smith, she challenged Smith again in 2018 and won. In 2018, Bahner's race was one of the top three races that generated the most outside spending and was supported by the Give Smart project. 

Bahner serves as the vice chair of the Human Services Finance Committee and sits on the Elections Finance and Policy, Health Finance and Policy, and State and Local Government Finance and Policy Committees. From 2021 to 2022, she was vice chair of the Human Services Finance and Policy Committee, and from 2019 to 2020 she served as vice chair of the Subcommittee on Elections.

Bahner was appointed by Governor Tim Walz to serve on the governor's Blue Ribbon Panel on IT Reform. She also was appointed vice chair of the Legislative Commission on Cybersecurity, which was created to identify vulnerabilities in Minnesota's cyberdefenses. Bahner has authored legislation that would make it easier for women to get access to long-acting reversible contraceptives (LARC) shortly after giving birth.

Electoral history

Personal life
Bahner live in Maple Grove, Minnesota and has a partner named Brahme.

References

External links

 Official House of Representatives website
 Official campaign website

Living people
People from Maple Grove, Minnesota
Gustavus Adolphus College alumni
Democratic Party members of the Minnesota House of Representatives
21st-century American politicians
21st-century American women politicians
Women state legislators in Minnesota
Year of birth missing (living people)